The 1953 Iranian coup d'état, known in Iran as the 28 Mordad coup d'état, was the U.S.- and UK-instigated, Iranian army-led overthrow of the democratically elected Prime Minister Mohammad Mosaddegh in favor of strengthening the monarchical rule of the Shah, Mohammad Reza Pahlavi, on 19 August 1953. It was aided by the United States (under the name TPAJAX Project or "Operation Ajax") and the United Kingdom (under the name "Operation Boot"). The clergy also played a considerable role.

Mosaddegh had sought to audit the documents of the Anglo-Iranian Oil Company (AIOC), a British corporation (now part of BP), to verify that AIOC was paying the contracted royalties to Iran, and to limit the company's control over Iranian oil reserves. Upon the AIOC's refusal to cooperate with the Iranian government, the parliament (Majlis) voted to nationalize Iran's oil industry and to expel foreign corporate representatives from the country. After this vote, Britain instigated a worldwide boycott of Iranian oil to pressure Iran economically. Initially, Britain mobilized its military to seize control of the British-built Abadan oil refinery, then the world's largest, but Prime Minister Clement Attlee (in power until 1951) opted instead to tighten the economic boycott while using Iranian agents to undermine Mosaddegh's government. Judging Mosaddegh to be unamenable and fearing the growing influence of the communist Tudeh, UK prime minister Winston Churchill and the Eisenhower administration decided in early 1953 to overthrow Iran's government. The preceding Truman administration had opposed a coup, fearing the precedent that Central Intelligence Agency (CIA) involvement would set,  and the U.S. government had been considering unilateral action (without UK support) to assist the Mosaddegh government as late as 1952. British intelligence officials' conclusions and the UK government's solicitations to the US were instrumental in initiating and planning the coup. 

Following the coup, a government under General Fazlollah Zahedi was formed which allowed Mohammad Reza Pahlavi, the Shah of Iran (Persian for 'king'), to rule more firmly as monarch. He relied heavily on United States support to hold on to power. According to the CIA's declassified documents and records, some of the most feared mobsters in Tehran were hired by the CIA to stage pro-Shah riots on 19 August. Other men paid by the CIA were brought into Tehran in buses and trucks, and took over the streets of the city. Between 200 and 300 people were killed because of the conflict. Mosaddegh was arrested, tried and convicted of treason by the Shah's military court. On 21 December 1953, he was sentenced to three years in jail, then placed under house arrest for the remainder of his life. Other Mosaddegh supporters were imprisoned, and several received the death penalty. After the coup, the Shah continued his rule as monarch for the next 26 years until he was overthrown in the Iranian Revolution in 1979.

In August 2013, the U.S. government formally acknowledged the U.S. role in the coup by releasing a bulk of previously classified government documents that show it was in charge of both the planning and the execution of the coup, including the bribing of Iranian politicians, security and army high-ranking officials, as well as pro-coup propaganda. The CIA is quoted acknowledging the coup was carried out "under CIA direction" and "as an act of U.S. foreign policy, conceived and approved at the highest levels of government".

Background

Throughout the 19th century, Iran was caught between two advancing imperial powers, Russia and Britain. In 1892, the British diplomat George Curzon described Iran as "pieces on a chessboard upon which is being played out a game for the dominion of the world." During the latter half of the 19th century, the concession policies of the monarchy faced increased opposition. In 1872, a representative of British entrepreneur Paul Reuter met with the Iranian monarch Naser al-Din Shah Qajar and agreed to fund the monarch's upcoming lavish visit to Europe in return for exclusive contracts for Iranian roads, telegraphs, mills, factories, extraction of resources, and other public works, in which Reuter would receive a stipulated sum for five years and 60% of all the net revenue for 20 years. However, the so-called "Reuter concession" was never put into effect because of violent opposition at home and from Russia. In 1892 the Shah was forced to revoke a tobacco monopoly given to Major G. F. Talbot, following protests and a widespread tobacco boycott.

In 1901, Mozzafar al-Din Shah Qajar granted a 60-year petroleum search concession to William Knox D'Arcy. D'Arcy paid £20,000 (equivalent to £ million in ), according to journalist-turned-historian Stephen Kinzer, and promised equal ownership shares, with 16% of any future net profit, as calculated by the company. However, the historian L. P. Elwell-Sutton wrote, in 1955, that "Persia's share was 'hardly spectacular' and no money changed hands." On 31 July 1907, D'Arcy withdrew from his private holdings in Persia, and transferred them to the British-owned Burmah Oil Company. The company grew slowly until World War I, when Persia's strategic importance led the British government to buy a controlling share in the company, essentially nationalizing British oil production in Iran.

The British angered the Persians by intervening in their domestic affairs, including in the Persian Constitutional Revolution. Massive popular protests had forced Mozzafar al-Din Shah to allow for the Constitution of 1906, which limited his powers. It allowed for a democratically elected parliament Majlis to make the laws, and a prime minister to sign and carry them out. The Prime Minister would be appointed by the Shah after a vote of confidence from Parliament. Nevertheless, the new constitution gave the shah many executive powers as well. It allowed for the shah to issue royal decrees (Farman), gave him the power to appoint and dismiss prime ministers (upon votes of confidence from Parliament), appoint half of the members of the Senate (which was not convened until 1949), and introduce bills to and even dissolve Parliament. It abolished arbitrary rule, but the shah served as an executive, rather than in a ceremonial role; consequently when a shah was weak, the government was more democratic, but when the shah acted on his own, the democratic aspects of the government could be sidelined. The contradictory aspects of this constitution would cause conflicts in the future. The Constitutional Revolution was opposed by the British and Russians, who attempted to subvert it through the backing of Mohammad Ali Shah Qajar (the son of Mozzafar-e-din Shah), who tried to break up the democratic government by force. A guerrilla movement led by Sattar Khan deposed him in 1910.

In the aftermath of World War I there was widespread political dissatisfaction with the royalty terms of the British petroleum concession, under the Anglo-Persian Oil Company (APOC), whereby Persia received 16% of "net profits". In 1921, after years of severe mismanagement under the Qajar dynasty, a coup d'état (allegedly backed by the British) brought a general, Reza Khan, into the government. By 1923, he had become prime minister, and gained a reputation as an effective politician with a lack of corruption. By 1925 under his influence, Parliament voted to remove Ahmad Shah Qajar from the throne, and Reza Khan was crowned Reza Shah Pahlavi, of the Pahlavi Dynasty. Reza Shah began a rapid and successful modernization program in Persia, which up until that point had been considered to be among the most impoverished countries in the world. Nevertheless, Reza Shah was also a very harsh ruler who did not tolerate dissent. By the 1930s, he had suppressed all opposition, and had sidelined the democratic aspects of the constitution. Opponents were jailed and in some cases even executed. While some agreed with his policies, arguing that it was necessary as Iran was in such turmoil, others argued that it was unjustified. One such opponent was a politician named Mohammad Mosaddegh, who was jailed in 1940. The experience gave him a lasting dislike for authoritarian rule and monarchy, and it helped make Mosaddegh a dedicated advocate of complete oil nationalization in Iran.

Reza Shah attempted to attenuate the power of the colonial forces in Iran, and was successful to a large extent. However, he also needed them to help modernize the country. He did so by balancing the influence of various colonial powers, including that of Britain and Germany. In the 1930s, Reza Shah tried to terminate the APOC concession that the Qajar dynasty had granted, but Iran was still weak and Britain would not allow it. The concession was renegotiated on terms again favorable to the British (although the D'Arcy Concession was softened). On 21 March 1935, Reza Shah changed the name of the country from Persia to Iran. The Anglo-Persian Oil Company was then renamed the Anglo-Iranian Oil Company (AIOC).

In 1941, after the German invasion of the Soviet Union, British and Soviet forces invaded and occupied Iran, which was largely unopposed by the Iranian government and military. After World War II had broken out, Reza Shah had declared Iran's neutrality, and attempted to appease the British, Soviets and Germans, all of whom maintained a degree of influence in Iran. The primary reasons behind the Anglo-Soviet invasion was to remove German influence in Iran and secure control over Iran's oil fields and the Trans-Iranian Railway in order to deliver supplies to the USSR. Reza Shah was deposed and exiled by the British to South Africa, and his 22-year-old son Mohammad Reza Pahlavi was installed as the new Shah of Iran. Mohammad Reza Pahlavi was supported by the Allies because they viewed him as being less able to act against their interests in Iran. The new Shah, unlike his father, was initially a mild leader and at times indecisive. During the 1940s he did not for most part take an independent role in the government, and much of Reza Shah's authoritarian policies were rolled back. Iranian democracy effectively was restored during this period as a result.

The British occupational force withdrew from Iran after the end of the war. However, under Stalin, the Soviet Union partly remained by sponsoring two "People's Democratic Republics" within Iran's borders. The related conflict was ended when the US lobbied for the Iranian Army to reassert control over the two occupied territories. The earlier agreed-upon Soviet-Iranian oil agreement would never be honored. Nationalist leaders in Iran became influential by seeking a reduction in long-term foreign interventions in their country—especially the oil concession which was very profitable for the West and not very profitable for Iran. The British-controlled AIOC refused to allow its books to be audited to determine whether the Iranian government was being paid what had been promised. British intransigence irked the Iranian population.

U.S. objectives in the Middle East remained the same between 1947 and 1952 but its strategy changed. Washington remained "publicly in solidarity and privately at odds" with Britain, its World War II ally. Britain's empire was steadily weakening, and with an eye on international crises, the U.S. re-appraised its interests and the risks of being identified with British colonial interests. "In Saudi Arabia, to Britain's extreme disapproval, Washington endorsed the arrangement between ARAMCO and Saudi Arabia in the 50/50 accord that had reverberations throughout the region."

Iran's oil had been discovered and later controlled by the British-owned AIOC. Popular discontent with the AIOC began in the late 1940s: a large segment of Iran's public and a number of politicians saw the company as exploitative and a central tool of continued British imperialism in Iran.

Oil nationalization crisis

Assassination attempt on the Shah, and the appointment of Mosaddegh as Prime Minister
In 1949, an assassin attempted to kill the Shah. Shocked by the experience and emboldened by public sympathy for his injury, the Shah began to take an increasingly active role in politics. He quickly organized the Iran Constituent Assembly to amend the constitution to increase his powers. He established the Senate of Iran, which had been a part of the Constitution of 1906 but had never been convened. The Shah had the right to appoint half the senators, and he chose men sympathetic to his aims. Mosaddegh thought this increase in the Shah's political power was not democratic; he believed that the Shah should "reign, but not rule" in a manner similar to Europe's constitutional monarchies. Led by Mosaddegh, political parties and opponents of the Shah's policies banded together to form a coalition known as the National Front. Oil nationalization was a major policy goal for the party.

By 1951, the National Front had won majority seats for the popularly elected Majlis (Parliament of Iran). According to Iran's constitution, the majority elected party in the parliament would give a vote of confidence for its prime minister candidate, after which the Shah would appoint the candidate to power. The Prime Minister Haj Ali Razmara, who opposed the oil nationalization on technical grounds, was assassinated by the hardline Fadaiyan e-Islam (whose spiritual leader the Ayatollah Abol-Qassem Kashani, a mentor to the future Ayatollah Ruhollah Khomeini, had been appointed Speaker of the Parliament by the National Front). After a vote of confidence from the National Front dominated Parliament, Mosaddegh was appointed prime minister of Iran by the Shah (replacing Hossein Ala, who had replaced Razmara). Under heavy pressure by the National Front, the assassin of Razmara (Khalil Tahmasebi) was released and pardoned, thus proving the movement's power in Iranian politics. For the time being, Mosaddegh and Kashani were allies of convenience, as Mosaddegh saw that Kashani could mobilize the "religious masses", while Kashani wanted Mosaddegh to drive out British and other foreign influence. Kashani's Fadaiyan mobs often violently attacked the opponents of nationalization and opponents of the National Front government, as well as "immoral objects", acting at times as unofficial "enforcers" for the movement. However, by late 1952 Mosaddegh was becoming increasingly opposed to Kashani, as the latter was contributing to mass political instability in Iran. Kashani in turn, berated Mosaddegh for not "Islamizing" Iran, as he was a firm believer in the separation of religion and state.

The Shah and his prime minister had an antagonistic relationship. Part of the problem stemmed from the fact that Mosaddegh was connected by blood to the former royal Qajar dynasty, and saw the Pahlavi king as a usurper to the throne. But the real issue stemmed from the fact that Mosaddegh represented a pro-democratic force that wanted to temper the Shah's rule in Iranian politics. He wanted the Shah to be a ceremonial monarch rather than a ruling monarch, thus giving the elected government power over the un-elected Shah. While the constitution of Iran gave the Shah the power to rule directly, Mosaddegh used the united National Front bloc and the widespread popular support for the oil nationalization vote (the latter which the Shah supported as well) in order to block the Shah's ability to act. As a result, the oil nationalization issue became increasingly intertwined with Mosaddegh's pro-democracy movement. The dejected Shah was angered by Mosaddegh's "insolence" (according to Abbas Milani, he angrily paced in the rooms of his palace at the thought that he would be reduced to a figurehead). But Mosaddegh and the oil nationalization's popularity prevented the Shah from acting against his prime minister (which was allowed under Iran's constitution, something that Mosaddegh felt a king had no right to do). In 1952 the Shah dismissed Mosaddegh, replacing him with Ahmad Qavam (a veteran prime minister). But widespread protests by Mosaddegh supporters resulted in the Shah immediately reinstating him.

Oil nationalization, the Abadan crisis, and rising tensions
In late 1951, Iran's Parliament in a near unanimous vote approved the oil nationalization agreement. The bill was widely popular among most Iranians, and generated a huge wave of nationalism, and immediately put Iran at loggerheads with Britain (the handful of MPs that disagreed with it voted for it as well in the face of overwhelming popular support, and the Fadaiyan's wrath). The nationalization made Mosaddegh instantly popular among millions of Iranians, cementing him as a national hero, and placing him and Iran at the centre of worldwide attention. Many Iranians felt that for the first time in centuries, they were taking control of the affairs of their country. Many also expected that nationalization would result in a massive increase of wealth for Iranians.

Britain now faced the newly elected nationalist government in Iran where Mosaddegh, with strong backing of the Iranian parliament and people, demanded more favorable concessionary arrangements, which Britain vigorously opposed.

The U.S. State Department not only rejected Britain's demand that it continue to be the primary beneficiary of Iranian oil reserves but "U.S. international oil interests were among the beneficiaries of the concessionary arrangements that followed nationalization."

Mohammad Mosaddegh attempted to negotiate with the AIOC, but the company rejected his proposed compromise. Mosaddegh's plan, based on the 1948 compromise between the Venezuelan Government of Romulo Gallegos and Creole Petroleum, would divide the profits from oil 50/50 between Iran and Britain. Against the recommendation of the United States, Britain refused this proposal and began planning to undermine and overthrow the Iranian government.

In July 1951, the American diplomat Averell Harriman went to Iran to negotiate an Anglo-Iranian compromise, asking the Shah's help; his reply was that "in the face of public opinion, there was no way he could say a word against nationalisation". Harriman held a press conference in Tehran, calling for reason and enthusiasm in confronting the "nationalisation crisis". As soon as he spoke, a journalist rose and shouted: "We and the Iranian people all support Premier Mosaddegh and oil nationalisation!" Everyone present began cheering and then marched out of the room; the abandoned Harriman shook his head in dismay.

On a visit to the United States in October 1951, Mosaddegh—in spite of the popularity of nationalization in Iran—agreed in talks with George C. McGhee to a complex settlement of the crisis involving the sale of the Abadan Refinery to a non-British company and Iranian control of the extraction of crude oil. The US waited until Winston Churchill became prime minister to present the deal, believing he would be more flexible, but the deal was rejected by the British.

The National Iranian Oil Company suffered decreased production, because of Iranian inexperience and the AIOC's orders that British technicians not work with them, thus provoking the Abadan Crisis that was aggravated by the Royal Navy's blockading its export markets to pressure Iran to not nationalise its petroleum. The Iranian revenues were greater, because the profits went to Iran's national treasury rather than to private, foreign oil companies. By September 1951, the British had virtually ceased Abadan oil field production, forbidden British export to Iran of key British commodities (including sugar and steel), and had frozen Iran's hard currency accounts in British banks. British Prime Minister Clement Attlee considered seizing the Abadan Oil Refinery by force, but instead settled on an embargo by the Royal Navy, stopping any ship transporting Iranian oil for carrying so-called "stolen property". On his re-election as prime minister, Winston Churchill took an even harder stance against Iran.

The United Kingdom took its anti-nationalization case against Iran to the International Court of Justice at The Hague; PM Mosaddegh said the world would learn of a "cruel and imperialistic country" stealing from a "needy and naked people". The court ruled that it had no jurisdiction over the case. Nevertheless, the British continued to enforce the embargo of Iranian oil. In August 1952, Iranian Prime Minister Mosaddegh invited an American oil executive to visit Iran and the Truman administration welcomed the invitation. However, the suggestion upset Churchill, who insisted that the U.S. not undermine his campaign to isolate Mosaddegh because of British support for the U.S. in the Korean War.

In mid-1952, Britain's embargo of Iranian oil was devastatingly effective. British agents in Tehran "worked to subvert" the government of Mosaddegh, who sought help from President Truman and then the World Bank but to no avail. "Iranians were becoming poorer and unhappier by the day" and Mosaddegh's political coalition was fraying. To make matters worse, the Speaker of the Parliament Ayatollah Kashani, Mosaddegh's main clerical supporter, became increasingly opposed to the Prime Minister, because Mosaddegh was squeezing him out of power. By 1953, he had completely turned on him, and supported the coup, depriving Mosaddegh of religious support, while giving it to the Shah.

In the Majlis election in the spring of 1952, Mosaddegh "had little to fear from a free vote, since despite the country's problems, he was widely admired as a hero. A free vote, however, was not what others were planning. British agents had fanned out across the country, bribing candidates, and the regional bosses who controlled them. Robert Zaehner alone spent over a £1,500,000, smuggled in biscuit tins, to bribe Iranians, and later his colleague Norman Darbyshire admitted that the actual coup cost the British government a further £700,000. They hoped to fill the Majlis with deputies who would vote to depose Mosaddegh. It would be a coup carried out by seemingly legal means."

While the National Front, which often supported Mosaddegh won handily in the big cities, there was no one to monitor voting in the rural areas. Violence broke out in Abadan and other parts of the country where elections were hotly contested. Faced with having to leave Iran for The Hague where Britain was suing for control of Iranian oil, Mosaddegh's cabinet voted to postpone the remainder of the election until after the return of the Iranian delegation from The Hague.

While Mosaddegh dealt with political challenge, he faced another that most Iranians considered far more urgent. The British blockade of Iranian seaports meant that Iran was left without access to markets where it could sell its oil. The embargo had the effect of causing Iran to spiral into bankruptcy. Tens of thousands had lost their jobs at the Abadan refinery, and although most understood and passionately supported the idea of nationalisation, they naturally hoped that Mosaddegh would find a way to put them back to work. The only way he could do that was to sell oil.

To make matters worse, the Communist Tudeh Party, which supported the Soviet Union and had attempted to kill the Shah only four years earlier, began to infiltrate the military and send mobs to "support Mosaddegh" (but in reality to marginalize all non-Communist opponents). Earlier, the Tudeh had denounced Mosaddegh, but by 1953 they changed tack and decided to "support" him. The Tudeh violently attacked opponents under the guise of helping the prime minister (the cousin of the future queen of Iran, Farah Pahlavi, was stabbed at the age of 13 in his school by Tudeh activists), and unwittingly helped cause Mosaddegh's reputation to decline, despite the fact that he never officially endorsed them. However, by 1953 he and the Tudeh had formed an unofficial alliance of convenience with each other; the Tudeh were the "foot soldiers" for his government, effectively replacing the Fadaiyan in that role, all the while secretly hoping that Mosaddegh would institute communism. Pro-Shah mobs also carried out attacks on Mosaddegh opponents, and there may have been some CIA coordination.

Worried about Britain's other interests in Iran, and (thanks to the Tudeh party) believing that Iran's nationalism was really a Soviet-backed plot, Britain persuaded US Secretary of State John Foster Dulles that Iran was falling to the Soviets—effectively exploiting the American Cold War mindset. Since President Harry S. Truman was busy fighting a war in Korea, he did not agree to overthrow the government of Prime Minister Mohammad Mosaddegh. However, in 1953, when Dwight D. Eisenhower became president, the UK convinced the U.S. to undertake a joint coup d'état.

Final months of Mosaddegh's government

By 1953, economic tensions caused by the British embargo and political turmoil began to take a major toll on Mosaddegh's popularity and political power. He was increasingly blamed for the economic and political crisis. Political violence was becoming widespread in the form of street clashes between rival political groups. Mosaddegh was losing popularity and support among the working class which had been his strongest supporters. As he lost support, he became more autocratic. As early as August 1952, he began to rely on emergency powers to rule, generating controversy among his supporters. After an assassination attempt upon one of his cabinet ministers and himself, he ordered the jailing of dozens of his political opponents. This act created widespread anger among the general public, and led to accusations that Mosaddegh was becoming a dictator. The Tudeh party's unofficial alliance with Mosaddegh led to fears of communism, and increasingly it was the communists who were taking part in pro-Mosaddegh rallies and attacking opponents.

By mid-1953 a mass of resignations by Mosaddegh's parliamentary supporters reduced the National Front seats in Parliament. A referendum to dissolve parliament and give the prime minister power to make law was submitted to voters, and it passed with 99.9 percent approval, 2,043,300 votes to 1300 votes against. The referendum was widely seen by opponents as treason and an act against the Shah, who was stripped of military power and control over national resources. This act would be one of many key factors in a chain of events leading to Mosaddegh's deposition.

The Shah himself initially opposed the coup plans and supported the oil nationalization, but he joined in after being informed by the CIA that he too would be "deposed" if he didn't play along. The experience left him with a lifelong awe of American power and would contribute to his pro-US policies while generating a hatred of the British. Mosaddegh's decision to dissolve Parliament also contributed to his decision.

Execution of Operation Ajax

The official pretext for the start of the coup was Mosaddegh's decree to dissolve Parliament, giving himself and his cabinet complete power to rule, while effectively stripping the Shah of his powers. It resulted in him being accused of giving himself "total and dictatorial powers." The Shah, who had been resisting the CIA's demands for the coup, finally agreed to support it.
Having obtained the Shah's concurrence, the CIA executed the coup. Firmans (royal decrees) dismissing Mosaddegh and appointing General Fazlollah Zahedi (a loyalist who had helped Reza Shah reunify Iran decades earlier) were drawn up by the coup plotters and signed by the Shah. Having signed the decrees and delivered them to General Zahedi, he and Queen Soraya departed for a week-long vacation in northern Iran. On Saturday 15 August, Colonel Nematollah Nassiri, the commander of the Imperial Guard, delivered to Mosaddegh a firman from the Shah dismissing him. Mosaddegh, who had been warned of the plot, probably by the Communist Tudeh Party, rejected the firman and had Nassiri arrested. Mosaddegh argued at his trial after the coup that under the Iranian constitutional monarchy, the Shah had no constitutional right to issue an order for the elected Prime Minister's dismissal without Parliament's consent. However, the constitution at the time did allow for such an action, which Mosaddegh considered unfair. The action was publicized within Iran by the CIA and in the United States by The New York Times. Mosaddegh's supporters took to the streets in violent protests. Following the failed coup attempt, the Shah, accompanied by his second wife Soraya Esfandiary-Bakhtiari and Aboul Fath Atabay fled to Baghdad. Arriving unannounced, the Shah asked for permission for himself and his consort to stay in Baghdad for a few days before continuing on to Europe. After high-level Government consultations, they were escorted to the White House, the Iraqi Government's guest house, before flying to Italy in a plane flown by Mohammad Amir Khatami.

After the first coup attempt failed, General Zahedi, declaring that he was the rightful prime minister of Iran, shuttled between multiple safe houses attempting to avoid arrest. Mosaddegh ordered security forces to capture the coup plotters, and dozens were imprisoned. Believing that he had succeeded, and that he was in full control of the government, Mosaddegh erred. Assuming that the coup had failed, he asked his supporters to return to their homes and to continue with their lives as normal. The Tudeh party members also returned to their homes, no longer carrying out enforcement duties. The CIA was ordered to leave Iran, although Kermit Roosevelt Jr. was slow to receive the message—allegedly due to MI6 interference—and eagerly continued to foment anti-Mosaddegh unrest. The Eisenhower administration considered changing its policy to support Mosaddegh, with undersecretary of state Walter Bedell Smith remarking on 17 August: "Whatever his faults, Mosaddegh had no love for the Russians and timely aid might enable him to keep Communism in check."

General Zahedi, who was still on the run, met with the pro-Shah Ayatollah Mohammad Behbahani and other Shah supporters in secret. There (using CIA money deridingly known as "Behbahani dollars"), they quickly created a new plan. Already, much of the country's upper class was in shock from the Shah's flight from Iran, fears of communism, and Mosaddegh's arrests of opponents. They capitalized on this sentiment in their plans. The Ayatollah Behbahani also used his influence to rally religious demonstrators against Mosaddegh.

On 19 August, hired infiltrators posing as Tudeh party members began to organize a "communist revolution". They came and encouraged real Tudeh members to join in. Soon, the Tudeh members took to the streets attacking virtually any symbols of capitalism, and looting private businesses and destroying shops. Much of southern Tehran's business district, including the bazaars, were vandalized. With sudden mass public revulsion against this act, the next part of Zahedi's plan came into action. From the vandalized bazaars, a second group of paid infiltrators, this time posing as Shah supporters, organized angry crowds of common Iranians who were terrified about a "communist revolution" and sickened by the violence.

The CIA hired the two biggest gangsters of the South Tehran ghetto,  "Icy Ramadan" and Shaban Jafari A.K.A "Brainless Shaban", to mobilize protest against Mosaddegh.

By the middle of the day, large crowds of regular citizens, armed with improvised weapons, took to the streets in mass demonstrations, and beat back the Tudeh party members. Under Zahedi's authority, the army left its barracks and drove off the communist Tudeh and then stormed all government buildings with the support of demonstrators. Mosaddegh fled after a tank fired a single shell into his house, but he later turned himself in to the army's custody. To prevent further bloodshed, he refused a last attempt to organize his supporters. By the end of the day, Zahedi and the army were in control of the government. Despite the CIA's role in creating the conditions for the coup, there is little evidence to suggest that Kermit Roosevelt Jr. or other CIA officials were directly responsible for the actions of the demonstrators or the army on 19 August. It has even been suggested that Roosevelt's activities between 15 and 19 August were primarily intended to organize "stay-behind networks as part of the planned CIA evacuation of the country," although they allowed him to later "claim responsibility for the day's outcome."  In 2014, historian Ray Takeyh conclusively showed that the US-led coup attempt was unsuccessful, with the CIA writing to Eisenhower that "The move failed […] We now [...] probably have to snuggle up to Mosaddeq if we’re going to save [our influence in Iran];” the demonstrations that led to Mosaddeq's resignation took place some weeks after the Roosevelt-organized ones, and were composed of average citizens, not the thugs-for-hire that the CIA and MI6 had recruited.

The Shah stayed in a hotel in Italy until he learned what had transpired, upon which he "chokingly declared": "I knew they loved me." Allen Dulles, the director of the CIA, flew back with the Shah from Rome to Tehran. Zahedi officially replaced Mosaddegh. Mosaddegh was arrested, tried, and originally sentenced to death. But on the Shah's personal orders, his sentence was commuted to three years' solitary confinement in a military prison, followed by house arrest until his death.

United States' role
As a condition for restoring the Anglo-Iranian Oil Company, in 1954 the US required removal of the AIOC's monopoly; five American petroleum companies, Royal Dutch Shell, and the Compagnie Française des Pétroles, were to draw Iran's petroleum after the successful coup d'état—Operation Ajax. The Shah declared this to be a "victory" for Iranians, with the massive influx of money from this agreement resolving the economic collapse from the last three years, and allowing him to carry out his planned modernization projects.

As part of that, the CIA organized anti-Communist guerrillas to fight the Tudeh Party if they seized power in the chaos of Operation Ajax. Released National Security Archive documents showed that Undersecretary of State Walter Bedell Smith reported that the CIA had agreed with Qashqai tribal leaders, in south Iran, to establish a clandestine safe haven from which U.S.-funded guerrillas and spies could operate.

Operation Ajax's formal leader was senior CIA officer Kermit Roosevelt Jr., while career agent Donald Wilber was the operational leader, planner, and executor of the deposition of Mosaddegh. The coup d'état depended on the impotent Shah's dismissing the popular and powerful Prime Minister and replacing him with General Fazlollah Zahedi, with help from Colonel Abbas Farzanegan—a man agreed upon by the British and Americans after determining his anti-Soviet politics.

The CIA sent Major General Norman Schwarzkopf Sr. to persuade the exiled Shah to return to rule Iran. Schwarzkopf trained the security forces that would become known as SAVAK to secure the shah's hold on power.

The coup was carried out by the US administration of Dwight D. Eisenhower in a covert action advocated by Secretary of State John Foster Dulles, and implemented under the supervision of his brother Allen Dulles, the Director of Central Intelligence. The coup was organized by the United States' CIA and the United Kingdom's MI6, two spy agencies that aided royalists and royalist elements of the Iranian army. Much of the money was channeled through the pro-Shah Ayatollah Mohammad Behbahani, who drew many religious masses to the plot. Ayatollah Kashani had completely turned on Mosaddegh and supported the Shah, by this point.

According to a heavily redacted CIA document released to the National Security Archive in response to a Freedom of Information request, "Available documents do not indicate who authorized CIA to begin planning the operation, but it almost certainly was President Eisenhower himself. Eisenhower biographer Stephen Ambrose has written that the absence of documentation reflected the President's style."

The CIA document then quotes from the Ambrose biography of Eisenhower:

CIA officer Kermit Roosevelt Jr., the grandson of former President Theodore Roosevelt, carried out the operation planned by CIA agent Donald Wilber. One version of the CIA history, written by Wilber, referred to the operation as TPAJAX.

During the coup, Roosevelt and Wilber, representatives of the Eisenhower administration, bribed Iranian government officials, reporters, and businessmen. They also bribed street thugs to support the Shah and oppose Mosaddegh. The deposed Iranian leader, Mosaddegh, was taken to jail and Iranian General Fazlollah Zahedi named himself prime minister in the new, pro-western government.

Another tactic Roosevelt admitted to using was bribing demonstrators into attacking symbols of the Shah, while chanting pro-Mosaddegh slogans. As king, the Shah was largely seen as a symbol of Iran at the time by many Iranians and monarchists. Roosevelt declared that the more that these agents showed their hate for the Shah and attacked his symbols, the more it caused the average Iranian citizen to dislike and distrust Mosaddegh.

The British and American spy agencies strengthened the monarchy in Iran by backing the pro-western Shah for the next 26 years. The Shah was overthrown in 1979. The overthrow of Iran's elected government in 1953 ensured Western control of Iran's petroleum resources and prevented the Soviet Union from competing for Iranian oil. Some Iranian clerics cooperated with the western spy agencies because they were dissatisfied with Mosaddegh's secular government.

While the broad outlines of the operation are known, "...the C.I.A.'s records were widely thought by historians to have the potential to add depth and clarity to a famous but little-documented intelligence operation," reporter Tim Weiner wrote in The New York Times 29 May 1997.

"The Central Intelligence Agency, which has repeatedly pledged for more than five years to make public the files from its secret mission to overthrow the government of Iran in 1953, said today that it had destroyed or lost almost all the documents decades ago."

A historian who was a member of the CIA staff in 1992 and 1993 said in an interview today that the records were obliterated by "a culture of destruction" at the agency. The historian, Nick Cullather, said he believed that records on other major cold war covert operations had been burned, including those on secret missions in Indonesia in the 1950s and a successful CIA-sponsored coup in Guyana in the early 1960s.

"Iran—there's nothing", Mr. Cullather said. "Indonesia—very little. Guyana—that was burned."

Donald Wilber, one of the CIA officers who planned the 1953 coup in Iran, wrote an account titled, Clandestine Service History Overthrow of Premier Mossadeq of Iran: November 1952 – August 1953. Wilber said one goal of the coup was to strengthen the Shah.

In 2000, James Risen at The New York Times obtained the previously secret CIA version of the coup written by Wilber and summarized its contents, which includes the following.

In early August, the CIA increased the pressure. Iranian operatives pretending to be Communists threatened Muslim leaders with "savage punishment if they opposed Mossadegh," seeking to stir anti-Communist sentiment in the religious community.

In addition, the secret history says, the house of at least one prominent Muslim was bombed by CIA agents posing as Communists. It does not say whether anyone was hurt in this attack.

The agency was intensifying its propaganda campaign. A leading newspaper owner was granted a personal loan of about $45,000, "in the belief that this would make his organ amenable to our purposes."

The Shah remained intransigent. In a 1 August meeting with General Norman Schwarzkopf, he refused to sign the C.I.A.-written decrees firing Mr. Mossadegh and appointing General Zahedi. He said he doubted that the army would support him in a showdown.

The National Security Archive at George Washington University contains the full account by Wilber, along with many other coup-related documents and analysis.

In a January 1973 telephone conversation made public in 2009, US President Richard Nixon told CIA Director Richard Helms, who was awaiting Senate confirmation to become the new U.S. Ambassador to Iran, that Nixon wanted Helms to be a "regional ambassador" to Persian Gulf oil states, and noted that Helms had been a schoolmate of Shah Reza Pahlavi.

Release of U.S. government records and official acknowledgement
In August 2013, on the 60th anniversary of the coup, the US government released documents showing they were involved in staging the coup. The documents also describe the motivations behind the coup and the strategies used to stage it. The UK had sought to censor information regarding its role in the coup; a significant number of documents about the coup remained classified. The release of the declassified documents, which marked the first US official acknowledgement of its role, was seen as a goodwill gesture on the part of the Obama administration. According to Aljazeera, the deputy director of the National Security Archive, Malcolm Bryne, disclosed that the CIA documented the secret histories purposely for official use.

Public awareness of American and British participation in Mosaddeq's overthrow was long-standing. An internal narrative from the middle of the 1970s called "The Battle for Iran" makes a clear reference to the CIA's involvement. In 1981, the agency made a highly edited version of the report public in reaction to an ACLU lawsuit, but it blocked out all mentions of TPAJAX, the code name for the American-led operation. These references can be found in the most recent release in 2013, which is thought to be the CIA's first official admission that the agency assisted in the coup's planning and execution.

In June 2017, the United States State Department's Office of the Historian released its revised historical account of the event. The volume of historical records "focuses on the evolution of U.S. thinking on Iran as well as the U.S. Government covert operation that resulted in Mosadeq's overthrow on 19 August 1953". Though some of the relevant records were destroyed long ago, the release contains a collection of roughly 1,000 pages, only a small number of which remain classified. One revelation is that the CIA "attempted to call off the failing coup but was salvaged by an insubordinate spy." The reports released by the U.S. had reached 1,007 pages, consisting of diplomatic cables and letters according to VOA News.

In March 2018, the National Security Archive released a declassified British memo alleging that the United States Embassy sent "large sums of money" to "influential people"—namely senior Iranian clerics—in the days leading up to Mosaddeq's overthrow. According to the Guardian, despite the U.S. showing regrets about the coup, it has failed to officially issue an apology over its involvement.

United States financial support
The CIA paid a large sum to carry out the operation. Depending on the expenses to be counted, the final cost is estimated to vary from $100,000 to $20 million. CIA gave Zahedi's government $5 million after the coup with Zahedi himself receiving an extra million.

United States motives
Historians disagree on what motivated the United States to change its policy towards Iran and stage the coup. Middle East historian Ervand Abrahamian identified the coup d'état as "a classic case of nationalism clashing with imperialism in the Third World". He states that Secretary of State Dean Acheson admitted the Communist threat' was a smokescreen" in responding to President Eisenhower's claim that the Tudeh party was about to assume power.

 Throughout the crisis, the "communist danger" was more of a rhetorical device than a real issue—i.e. it was part of the cold-war discourse ...The Tudeh was no match for the armed tribes and the 129,000-man military. What is more, the British and Americans had enough inside information to be confident that the party had no plans to initiate armed insurrection. At the beginning of the crisis, when the Truman administration was under the impression a compromise was possible, Acheson had stressed the communist danger, and warned if Mosaddegh was not helped, the Tudeh would take over. The (British) Foreign Office had retorted that the Tudeh was no real threat. But, in August 1953, when the Foreign Office echoed the Eisenhower administration's claim that the Tudeh was about to take over, Acheson now retorted that there was no such communist danger. Acheson was honest enough to admit that the issue of the Tudeh was a smokescreen.

Abrahamian states that Iran's oil was the central focus of the coup, for both the British and the Americans, though "much of the discourse at the time linked it to the Cold War". Abrahamian wrote, "If Mosaddegh had succeeded in nationalizing the British oil industry in Iran, that would have set an example and was seen at that time by the Americans as a threat to U.S. oil interests throughout the world, because other countries would do the same." Mosaddegh did not want any compromise solution that allowed a degree of foreign control. Abrahamian said that Mosaddegh "wanted real nationalization, both in theory and practice".

Tirman points out that agricultural land owners were politically dominant in Iran well into the 1960s, and the monarch Reza Shah's aggressive land expropriation policies—to the benefit of himself and his supporters—resulted in the Iranian government being Iran's largest land owner. "The landlords and oil producers had new backing, moreover, as American interests were for the first time exerted in Iran. The Cold War was starting, and Soviet challenges were seen in every leftist movement. But the reformers were at root nationalists, not communists, and the issue that galvanized them above all others was the control of oil." The belief that oil was the central motivator behind the coup has been echoed in the popular media by authors such as Robert Byrd, Alan Greenspan, and Ted Koppel.

Middle East political scientist Mark Gasiorowski states that while, on the face of it, there is considerable merit to the argument that U.S. policymakers helped U.S. oil companies gain a share in Iranian oil production after the coup, "it seems more plausible to argue that U.S. policymakers were motivated mainly by fears of a communist takeover in Iran, and that the involvement of U.S. companies was sought mainly to prevent this from occurring. The Cold War was at its height in the early 1950s, and the Soviet Union was viewed as an expansionist power seeking world domination. Eisenhower had made the Soviet threat a key issue in the 1952 elections, accusing the Democrats of being soft on communism and of having 'lost China.' Once in power, the new administration quickly sought to put its views into practice."

A 2019 study by Gasiorowski concluded "that U.S. policymakers did not have compelling evidence that the threat of a Communist takeover was increasing substantially in the months before the coup. Rather, the Eisenhower administration interpreted the available evidence in a more alarming manner than the Truman administration had."

Gasiorowski further states "the major U.S. oil companies were not interested in Iran at this time. A glut existed in the world oil market. The U.S. majors had increased their production in Saudi Arabia and Kuwait in 1951 in order to make up for the loss of Iranian production; operating in Iran would force them to cut back production in these countries which would create tensions with Saudi and Kuwaiti leaders. Furthermore, if nationalist sentiments remained high in Iran, production there would be risky. U.S. oil companies had shown no interest in Iran in 1951 and 1952. By late 1952, the Truman administration had come to believe that participation by U.S. companies in the production of Iranian oil was essential to maintain stability in Iran and keep Iran out of Soviet hands. In order to gain the participation of the major U.S. oil companies, Truman offered to scale back a large anti-trust case then being brought against them. The Eisenhower administration shared Truman's views on the participation of U.S. companies in Iran and also agreed to scale back the anti-trust case. Thus, not only did U.S. majors not want to participate in Iran at this time, it took a major effort by U.S. policymakers to persuade them to become involved."

In 2004, Gasiorowski edited a book on the coup arguing that "the climate of intense cold war rivalry between the superpowers, together with Iran's strategic vital location between the Soviet Union and the Persian Gulf oil fields, led U.S. officials to believe that they had to take whatever steps were necessary to prevent Iran from falling into Soviet hands." While "these concerns seem vastly overblown today" the pattern of "the 1945–46 Azerbaijan crisis, the consolidation of Soviet control in Eastern Europe, the communist triumph in China, and the Korean War—and with the Red Scare at its height in the United States" would not allow U.S. officials to risk allowing the Tudeh Party to gain power in Iran. Furthermore, "U.S. officials believed that resolving the oil dispute was essential for restoring stability in Iran, and after March 1953 it appeared that the dispute could be resolved only at the expense either of Britain or of Mosaddeq." He concludes "it was geostrategic considerations, rather than a desire to destroy Mosaddeq's movement, to establish a dictatorship in Iran or to gain control over Iran's oil, that persuaded U.S. officials to undertake the coup."
Faced with choosing between British interests and Iran, the U.S. chose Britain, Gasiorowski said. "Britain was the closest ally of the United States, and the two countries were working as partners on a wide range of vitally important matters throughout the world at this time. Preserving this close relationship was more important to U.S. officials than saving Mosaddeq's tottering regime." A year earlier, British Prime Minister Winston Churchill used Britain's support for the U.S. in the Cold War to insist the United States not undermine his campaign to isolate Mosaddegh. "Britain was supporting the Americans in Korea, he reminded Truman, and had a right to expect 'Anglo-American unity' on Iran."

According to Kinzer, for most Americans, the crisis in Iran became just part of the conflict between Communism and "the Free world". "A great sense of fear, particularly the fear of encirclement, shaped American consciousness during this period. ... Soviet power had already subdued Latvia, Lithuania, and Estonia. Communist governments were imposed on Bulgaria and Romania in 1946, Hungary and Poland in 1947, and Czechoslovakia in 1948. Albania and Yugoslavia also turned to communism. Greek communists made a violent bid for power. Soviet soldiers blocked land routes to Berlin for sixteen months. In 1949, the Soviet Union successfully tested a nuclear weapon. That same year, pro-Western forces in China lost their Civil War to communists led by Mao Zedong. From Washington, it seemed that enemies were on the march everywhere." Consequently, "the United States, challenged by what most Americans saw as a relentless communist advance, slowly ceased to view Iran as a country with a unique history that faced a unique political challenge." Some historians, including Douglas Little, Abbas Milani and George Lenczowski have echoed the view that fears of a communist takeover or Soviet influence motivated the U.S. to intervene.

On 11 May 1951, prior to the overthrow of Mosaddegh, Adolf A. Berle warned the U.S. State Department that U.S. "control of the Middle East was at stake, which, with its Persian Gulf oil, meant 'substantial control of the world.'"

News coverage in the United States and the United Kingdom
When Mosaddegh called for the dissolution of the Majlis in August 1953, the editors of the New York Times gave the opinion that: "A plebiscite more fantastic and farcical than any ever held under Hitler or Stalin is now being staged in Iran by Premier Mosaddegh in an effort to make himself unchallenged dictator of the country."

A year after the coup, the New York Times wrote on 6 August 1954, that a new oil "agreement between Iran and a consortium of foreign oil companies" was "good news indeed".

Costly as the dispute over Iranian oil has been to all concerned, the affair may yet be proved worthwhile if lessons are learned from it: Underdeveloped countries with rich resources now have an object lesson in the heavy cost that must be paid by one of their number which goes berserk with fanatical nationalism. It is perhaps too much to hope that Iran's experience will prevent the rise of Mossadeghs in other countries, but that experience may at least strengthen the hands of more reasonable and more far-seeing leaders. In some circles in Great Britain the charge will be pushed that American "imperialism"—in the shape of the American oil firms in the consortium!—has once again elbowed Britain from a historic stronghold.

The documentary Cinematograph aired on 18 August 2011 on the anniversary of the coup. In it, BBC admitted for the first time to the role of BBC Persian radio as the propaganda arm of the British government in Iran. The Cinematograph narrator said:

The documentary quoted a 21 July 1951 classified document in which a Foreign Office official thanked the British ambassador for his proposals that were precisely followed by the BBC Persian radio to strengthen its propaganda against Mosaddegh:

The document further stressed that the Foreign Office "shall be grateful for [the ambassador's] comments on the propaganda line we have proposed".

The BBC was at times even used directly in the operations, sending coded messages to the coup plotters by changing the wording of its broadcasts.

An early account of the CIA's role in the coup appeared in The Saturday Evening Post in late 1954, purporting to explain how "the strategic little nation of Iran was rescued from the closing clutch of Moscow." The report was approved by the CIA, and its authors may have been assisted by Kermit Roosevelt Jr., who had written for the Post before.

Britain's role
Despite the British government's pressure, the National Security Archive released two declassified documents in August 2017 which confirm the British solicitation of the United States' assistance in ousting Mosaddegh. According to these records, the British first approached the American government about a plan for the coup in November 1952 "repeatedly" asking U.S. to join the coup, claiming that the Mosaddegh government would be ineffective in preventing a communist takeover, and that Mosaddegh was a threat to America's global fight against communism, which they believed necessitated action; the records also state that UK and U.S. spy agencies had by then had "very tentative and preliminary discussions regarding the practicability of such a move". At the time, the American government was already preparing to aid Mosaddegh in his oil dealings with the British, and believed him to be anti-communist—considerations which made the U.S. government skeptical of the plot. Since President Truman's term was drawing to a close in January 1953, and there was too much uncertainty and danger associated with the plot, the U.S. government decided not to take action against Mosaddegh at the time.

According to the 1952 documents, it was Christopher Steel, the No 2 official in the British embassy in Washington, who "pitched" the idea of the coup to US officials amid the US-Britain talks which had begun in October. The document also says that the British officials rejected Paul Nitze's suggestion that, instead of executing a coup, they mount a "campaign" against Ayatollah Abolqasem Kashani, "a leading opponent of British involvement in Iran's oil industry", and the communist Tudeh Party. They "pressed US for a decision" since they knew "the Truman administration was in its final weeks". According to Wilber, the British Secret Intelligence Service worked with CIA to form a propaganda campaign via "the press, handbills and the Tehran clergy" to "weaken the Mossadeq government in any way possible".

Oil nationalization law led to a "direct conflict" between Mosaddegh and the British government. So, Britain tried to regain its control over the oil industry in Iran by following a "three-track strategy" aimed at either "pressuring him into a favorable settlement or by removing him from the office." The three component of Britain strategy was: I) "legal maneuvers" including refusing direct negotiation with Mosaddegh, II) Imposing economic sanctions on Iran accompanied by performing war games in the region and III) Removal of Mosaddegh through "covert political action".

The role of the clergy
Mosaddegh appointed a series of secular ministers to his cabinet during his premiership, losing his support with the clergy. In 1953, Ayatollah Abol-Qasem Kashani and his followers organised a series of protests against Mosaddegh's liberal reforms - such as the extension of the vote to women. By July 1953 when Mosaddegh asked for a critical extension of his emergency powers, "... Clerical members of the Majles who supported Kashani left the National Front Coalition and set up their own Islamic Faction...". (Muslim Warriors). This faction then  boycotted the 1953 referendum about the dissolution of parliament.

At 8am on 18 August Ayatollah Behbahan mobilised 3000 stick and club wielding anti-shah protestors formed a mob in Tehran. This was done in the hope that the removal of Mosaddegh would create a more religious government. Separate mobilisation was instigated by Ayatollah Kashani in the country at this time. There has been documentation that both Ayatollah Behbahani and Khomeini received funds from the CIA by some sources. The former's mob would lead Mosaddegh to abandon his residence, and ultimately his capture. Iranian Historian Michael Axworthy stated that "... [The clergy's] move to oppose Mossadeq was the decisive factor in his downfall...".

Aftermath
The coup has been said to have "left a profound and long-lasting legacy."

Blowback
The coup caused long-lasting damage to the U.S. reputation, according to documents released to the National Security Archive and reflected in the book Mohammad Mosaddeq and the 1953 Coup in Iran.
The '28 Mordad' coup, as it is known by its Persian date [in the Solar Hijri calendar], was a watershed for Iran, for the Middle East and for the standing of the United States in the region. The joint US-British operation ended Iran's drive to assert sovereign control over its own resources and helped put an end to a vibrant chapter in the history of the country's nationalist and democratic movements. These consequences resonated with dramatic effect in later years. When the Shah finally fell in 1979, memories of the US intervention in 1953, which made possible the monarch's subsequent, and increasingly unpopular, 25-year reign intensified the anti-American character of the revolution in the minds of many Iranians.

The authoritarian monarch appreciated the coup, Kermit Roosevelt wrote in his account of the affair. "'I owe my throne to God, my people, my army and to you!' By 'you' he [the shah] meant me and the two countries—Great Britain and the United States—I was representing. We were all heroes."

On 16 June 2000, The New York Times published the secret CIA report, "Clandestine Service History, Overthrow of Premier Mossadeq of Iran, November 1952 – August 1953," partly explaining the coup from CIA agent Wilber's perspective. In a related story, The New York Times reporter James Risen penned a story revealing that Wilber's report, hidden for nearly five decades, had recently come to light.

In the summer of 2001, Ervand Abrahamian writes in the journal Science & Society that Wilber's version of the coup was missing key information some of which was available elsewhere.

 The New York Times recently leaked a CIA report on the 1953 American-British overthrow of Mosaddeq, Iran's Prime Minister. It billed the report as a secret history of the secret coup, and treated it as an invaluable substitute for the U.S. files that remain inaccessible. But a reconstruction of the coup from other sources, especially from the archives of the British Foreign Office, indicates that this report is highly sanitized. It glosses over such sensitive issues as the crucial participation of the U.S. ambassador in the actual overthrow; the role of U.S. military advisers; the harnessing of local Nazis and Muslim terrorists; and the use of assassinations to destabilize the government. What is more, it places the coup in the context of the Cold War rather than that of the Anglo-Iranian oil crisis—a classic case of nationalism clashing with imperialism in the Third World.

In a review of Tim Weiner's Legacy of Ashes, historian Michael Beschloss wrote, "Mr. Weiner argues that a bad C.I.A. track record has encouraged many of our gravest contemporary problems... A generation of Iranians grew up knowing that the C.I.A. had installed the shah," Mr. Weiner notes. "In time, the chaos that the agency had created in the streets of Tehran would return to haunt the United States."

The administration of Dwight D. Eisenhower considered the coup a success, but, given its blowback, that opinion is no longer generally held, because of its "haunting and terrible legacy". In 2000, Madeleine Albright, U.S. Secretary of State, said that intervention by the U.S. in the internal affairs of Iran was a setback for democratic government. The coup is widely believed to have significantly contributed to the 1979 Iranian Revolution, which deposed the "pro-Western" Shah and replaced the monarchy with an "anti-Western" Islamic republic.

"For many Iranians, the coup demonstrated duplicity by the United States, which presented itself as a defender of freedom but did not hesitate to use underhanded methods to overthrow a democratically elected government to suit its own economic and strategic interests", the Agence France-Presse reported.

United States Supreme Court Justice William O. Douglas, who visited Iran both before and after the coup, wrote that "When Mosaddegh and Persia started basic reforms, we became alarmed. We united with the British to destroy him; we succeeded; and ever since, our name has not been an honored one in the Middle East."

Iran

Perceptions of the Shah
When the Shah returned to Iran after the coup, he was greeted by a cheering crowd. He wrote in his memoirs that while he had been a king for over a decade, for the first time he felt that the people had "elected" and "approved" of him, and that he had a "legitimate" popular mandate to carry out his reforms (although some in the crowd may have been bribed). The Shah was never able to remove the reputation of being a "foreign imposed" ruler among non-royalist Iranians. The Shah throughout his rule continued to assume that he was supported by virtually everybody in Iran, and sank into deep dejection when in 1978 massive mobs demanded his ouster. The incident left him in awe of American power, while it also gave him a deep hatred of the British.

Bloody suppression of the opposition
An immediate consequence of the coup d'état was the Shah's suppression of all republicanist political dissent, especially the liberal and nationalist opposition umbrella group National Front as well as the (Communist) Tudeh party, and concentration of political power in the Shah and his courtiers.

The minister of Foreign Affairs and the closest associate of Mosaddegh, Hossein Fatemi, was executed by order of the Shah's military court by firing squad on 10 November 1954. According to Kinzer, "The triumphant Shah [Pahlavi] ordered the execution of several dozen military officers and student leaders who had been closely associated with Mohammad Mosaddegh".

As part of the post-coup d'état political repression between 1953 and 1958, the Shah outlawed the National Front, and arrested most of its leaders. The Shah personally spared Mosaddegh the death penalty, and he was given 3 years in prison, followed by house arrest for life.

Many supporters of Iran continued to fight against the new regime, yet they were suppressed with some even being killed. The political party that Mosaddegh founded, the National Front of Iran, was later reorganized by Karim Sanjabi, and is currently being led by the National Poet of Iran Adib Boroumand, who was a strong Mosaddegh supporter and helped spread pro-Mosaddegh propaganda during the Abadan Crisis and its aftermath.

The Communist Tudeh bore the main brunt of the crackdown. The Shah's security forces arrested 4,121 Tudeh political activists including 386 civil servants, 201 college students, 165 teachers, 125 skilled workers, 80 textile workers, and 60 cobblers. Forty were executed (primarily for murder, such as Khosrow Roozbeh), another 14 died under torture and over 200 were sentenced to life imprisonment. The Shah's post-coup dragnet also captured 477 Tudeh members ("22 colonels, 69 majors, 100 captains, 193 lieutenants, 19 noncommissioned officers, and 63 military cadets") who were in the Iranian armed forces. After their presence was revealed, some National Front supporters complained that this Communist Tudeh military network could have saved Mosaddegh. However, few Tudeh officers commanded powerful field units, especially tank divisions that might have countered the coup. Most of the captured Tudeh officers came from the military academies, police and medical corps. At least eleven of the captured army officers were tortured to death between 1953 and 1958.

Creation of a secret police

After the 1953 coup, the Shah's government formed the SAVAK (secret police), many of whose agents were trained in the United States. The SAVAK monitored dissidents and carried out censorship. After the 1971 Siahkal Incident, it was given a "loose leash" to torture suspected dissidents with "brute force" that, over the years, "increased dramatically", and nearly 100 people were executed for political reasons during the last 20 years of the Shah's rule. After the revolution, SAVAK was officially abolished, but was in reality "drastically expanded" into a new organization that killed over 8,000–12,000 prisoners between 1981 and 1985 alone, and 20,000–30,000 in total, with one prisoner who served time under both the Shah and the Islamic Republic declaring that "four months under (Islamic Republic's) warden Asadollah Lajevardi took the toll of four years under SAVAK".

Oil policy
Another effect was sharp improvement of Iran's economy; the British-led oil embargo against Iran ended, and oil revenue increased significantly beyond the pre-nationalisation level. Despite Iran not controlling its national oil, the Shah agreed to replacing the Anglo-Iranian Oil Company with a consortium—British Petroleum and eight European and American oil companies; in result, oil revenues increased from $34 million in 1954–1955 to $181 million in 1956–1957, and continued increasing, and the United States sent development aid and advisers. The Shah's government attempted to solve the issue of oil nationalization through this method, and Iran began to develop rapidly under his rule. The Shah later in his memoirs declared that Mosaddegh was a "dictator" who was "damaging" Iran through his "stubbornness", while he (the Shah) "followed" the smarter option. By the 1970s, Iran was wealthier than all of its surrounding neighbors, and economists frequently predicted that it would become a major global economic power, and a developed country.

When the Shah attempted during the 1970s to once again control the oil prices (through OPEC), and cancel the same oil consortium agreement that caused the 1953 coup, it resulted in a massive decline in US support for the Shah, and ironically, hastened his downfall.

CIA staff historian David Robarge stated: "The CIA carried out [a] successful regime change operation. It also transformed a turbulent constitutional monarchy into an absolutist kingship and induced a succession of unintended consequences." The 1979 Iranian Revolution was a most impactful unintended consequence.

Internationally
Kinzer wrote that the 1953 coup d'état was the first time the United States used the CIA to overthrow a democratically elected, civil government. The Eisenhower administration viewed Operation Ajax as a success, with "immediate and far-reaching effect. Overnight, the CIA became a central part of the American foreign policy apparatus, and covert action came to be regarded as a cheap and effective way to shape the course of world events"—a coup engineered by the CIA called Operation PBSuccess toppling the duly elected Guatemalan government of Jacobo Arbenz Guzmán, which had nationalised farm land owned by the United Fruit Company, followed the next year.

A pro-American government in Iran extended the United States' geographic and strategic advantage in the Middle East, as Turkey, also bordering the USSR, was part of NATO.

In 2000, U.S. Secretary of State Madeleine K. Albright, acknowledged the coup's pivotal role in the troubled relationship and "came closer to apologizing than any American official ever has before".

The Eisenhower administration believed its actions were justified for strategic reasons. ... But the coup was clearly a setback for Iran's political development. And it is easy to see now why many Iranians continue to resent this intervention by America in their internal affairs.

In June 2009, the U.S. President Barack Obama in a speech in Cairo, Egypt, talked about the United States' relationship with Iran, mentioning the role of the U.S. in 1953 Iranian coup saying:

Legacy
In the Islamic Republic, remembrance of the coup is quite different from that of history books published in the West, and follows the precepts of Ayatollah Khomeini that Islamic jurists must guide the country to prevent "the influence of foreign powers". Kashani came out against Mosaddegh by mid-1953 and "told a foreign correspondent that Mosaddegh had fallen because he had forgotten that the shah enjoyed extensive popular support." A month later, Kashani "went even further and declared that Mosaddegh deserved to be executed because he had committed the ultimate offense: rebelling against the shah, 'betraying' the country, and repeatedly violating the sacred law."

Men associated with Mosaddegh and his ideals dominated Iran's first post-revolutionary government. The first prime minister after the Iranian revolution was Mehdi Bazargan, a close associate of Mosaddegh. But with the subsequent rift between the conservative Islamic establishment and the secular liberal forces, Mosaddegh's work and legacy has been largely ignored by the Islamic Republic establishment. However, Mosaddegh remains a popular historical figure among Iranian opposition factions. Mosaddegh's image is one of the symbols of Iran's opposition movement, also known as the Green Movement. Kinzer writes that Mosaddegh "for most Iranians" is "the most vivid symbol of Iran's long struggle for democracy" and that modern protesters carrying a picture of Mosaddegh is the equivalent of saying "We want democracy" and "No foreign intervention".

In the Islamic Republic of Iran, Kinzer's book All the Shah's Men: An American Coup and the Roots of Middle East Terror has been censored of descriptions of Ayatollah Abol-Ghasem Kashani's activities during the Anglo-American coup d'état. Mahmood Kashani, the son of Abol-Ghasem Kashani, "one of the top members of the current, ruling élite" whom the Iranian Council of Guardians has twice approved to run for the presidency, denies there was a coup d'état in 1953, saying Mosaddegh was obeying British plans to undermine the role of Shia clerics.

This allegation also is posited in the book Khaterat-e Arteshbod-e Baznesheshteh Hossein Fardoust (The Memoirs of Retired General Hossein Fardoust), published in the Islamic Republic and allegedly written by Hossein Fardoust, a former SAVAK officer. It says that rather than being a mortal enemy of the British, Mohammad Mosaddegh always favored them, and his nationalisation campaign of the Anglo-Iranian Oil Company was inspired by "the British themselves". Scholar Ervand Abrahamian suggests that the fact that Fardoust's death was announced before publication of the book may be significant, as the Islamic Republic authorities may have forced him into writing such statements under duress.

Viewpoints

Ruhollah Khomeini said the government did not pay enough attention to religious figures which caused the coup d'état to take place and described the separation between religion and politics as a fault in contemporary history.

Ali Khamenei believed that Mosaddegh trusted the United States and asked them to help confront Britain. As a result, the 1953 coup d'état was executed by the U.S. against Mosaddegh.

President Barack Obama of the United States, said in regard to the role of the U.S. in the 1953 Iranian coup d'état that the U.S. played a major role in the overthrow of a democratically elected prime minister.

In popular culture
Directed by Hasan Fathi and written jointly with playwright and university professor Naghmeh Samini, the TV series Shahrzad is the story of a love broken apart by events in the aftermath of the 1953 coup that overthrew the democratically elected prime minister, Mohammad Mosaddegh.

Cognito Comics/Verso Books has published a nonfiction graphic novel of the history,   Operation AJAX: The Story of the CIA Coup That Remade The Middle East, that covers events leading to how the CIA hired rival mobs to create chaos and overthrow the country.

See also

References

Bibliography

 Abrahamian, Ervand, Iran Between Two Revolutions (Princeton University Press, 1982)
 
 Dorril, Stephen, Mi6: Inside the Covert World of Her Majesty's Secret Intelligence Service  (paperback is separately titled: MI6: Fifty Years of Special Operations Fourth Estate: London, a division of HarperCollins )
 Dreyfuss, Robert, Devil's Game: How the United States Helped Unleash Fundamentalist Islam (Henry Holt and Company: 2005)
 Elm, Mostafa. Oil, Power and Principle: Iran's Oil Nationalization and Its Aftermath. (Syracuse University Press, 1994)  Documents competition between Britain and the United States for Iranian oil, both before and after the coup. Publishers Weekly summary: "an impressive work of scholarship by an Iranian economist and former diplomat [showing how] the CIA-orchestrated coup, followed by U.S. backing of the dictatorial Shah, planted"
 Elwell-Sutton, L. P. Persian Oil: A Study in Power Politics (Lawrence and Wishart Ltd.: London) 1955. Reprinted by Greenwood Press 1976. 
 Farmanfarmaiyan, Manuchihr, Roxane Farmanfarmaian Blood and Oil: A Prince's Memoir of Iran, from the Shah to the Ayatollah (Random House 2005.). A cousin of Mosaddeq, Farmanfarmaiyan was the Shah's oil adviser. Sympathetic to the Shah and antagonistic to Khomeini, Farmanfarmaiyan offers many insider details of the epic battle for Iranian oil, both in Iran's historic relationship with Britain and then, after the coup, with the United States.
 Gasiorowski, Mark J. U.S. Foreign Policy and the Shah: Building a Client State in Iran (Cornell University Press: 1991). Traces the exact changes in U.S. foreign policy that led to the coup in Iran soon after the inauguration of Dwight D. Eisenhower; describes "the consequences of the coup for Iran's domestic politics" including "an extensive series of arrests and installation of a rigid authoritarian regime under which all forms of opposition political activity were prohibited." Documents how U.S. oil industry benefited from the coup with, for the first time, 40 percent post-coup share in Iran's oil revenue.
 
 
 Gendzier, Irene. Notes From the Minefield: United States Intervention in Lebanon and the Middle East, 1945–1958 Westview Press, 1999. 
 Heiss, Mary Ann, Empire and Nationhood: The United States, Great Britain, and Iranian Oil, 1950–1954, Columbia University Press,1997. 
 
 
 Kinzer, Stephen, Overthrow: America's Century of Regime Change from Hawaii to Iraq (Henry Holt and Company 2006).  Assesses the influence of John Foster Dulles on U.S. foreign policy. "Dulles was tragically mistaken in his view that the Kremlin lay behind the emergence of nationalism in the developing world. He could... claim consistency in his uncompromising opposition to every nationalist, leftist, or Marxist regime on earth."
 McCoy, Alfred, A Question of Torture: CIA Interrogation, from the Cold War to the War on Terror (Metropolitan Books 2006)
 Rashid, Ahmed. Taliban: Militant Islam, Oil and Fundamentalism in Central Asia (Yale University Press 2010) 
 
 Weiner, Tim. Legacy of Ashes: The History of the CIA (Doubleday 2007) 
 Wilber "Clandestine Service History: Overthrow of Premier Mossadeq of Iran, Nov. 1952–1953" [CIA] CS Historical Paper no. 208. March 1954.

External links

 
 Dr. Mohammad Mosaddeq: Symbol of Iranian Nationalism and Struggle Against Imperialism by the Iran Chamber Society
 1953 Iran Coup: New U.S. Documents Confirm British Approached U.S. in Late 1952 About Ousting Mosaddeq–Provided by the National Security Archive
 The Secret CIA History of the Iran Coup, 1953. Provided by the National Security Archive
 Review of All the Shah's Men by CIA staff historian David S. Robarge 
 Radio Free Europe. From The Archives: The 1953 Iranian Coup. Photos

Military coups in Iran
Battles involving Iran
BP
Central Intelligence Agency operations
CIA activities in Iran
Cold War conflicts
Cold War history of Iran
Cold War intelligence operations
Conflicts in 1953
History of the foreign relations of the United States
Iran–United Kingdom relations
Iran–United States relations
Imperialism
Mohammad Mosaddegh
Mohammad Reza Pahlavi
Pahlavi Iran
United Kingdom intelligence operations
1950s coups d'état and coup attempts
Coup d'etat
1953 in the United Kingdom
1953 in the United States
August 1953 events in Asia
False flag operations
United States intelligence operations
United States involvement in regime change